Penkun is a town in the Vorpommern-Greifswald district, and one of the smallest in Mecklenburg-Western Pomerania, Germany. It is situated 25 km east of Prenzlau, and 23 km southwest of Szczecin.

Penkun is known for its Renaissance castle. Due to its proximity to the Szczecin agglomeration, it is a prospering town.

Towns near Penkun
 Szczecin (Poland)
 Eggesin (Germany)
 Ueckermünde (Germany)
 Torgelow (Germany)
 Pasewalk (Germany)
 Gartz (Germany)
 Gryfino (Poland)

References

External links

Vorpommern-Greifswald
Populated places established in the 13th century
1260s establishments in the Holy Roman Empire
1269 establishments in Europe